Fabienne André (born 20 September 1996) is a British wheelchair racer. In 2021, she won gold in the 100 m and 800 m at the 2021 World Para Athletics European Championships.

Life
She was born on 20 September 1996. She was first interested in swimming as a sport and she won three medals swimming at the Cerebral Palsy game in Barcelona in 2018. She later took an interest in athletics because she wanted to try a triathlon. She was training as a wheelchair racer in 2018. She has cerebral palsy and she competes in the T34 category. She works as a physiotherapist assistant.

Career 
André was chosen to compete at 100m and 800m (T34) as part of the Paralympics GB team at the postponed 2020 Summer Paralympics in Tokyo.

At the 2022 Commonwealth Games André won bronze in the T34 100m,being part of a Team England Podium Sweep in the event with fellow team mates Hannah Cockroft and Kare Adenegan.

References 

1996 births
Living people
Athletes (track and field) at the 2020 Summer Paralympics
English female sprinters
English female wheelchair racers
Medalists at the World Para Athletics European Championships
Paralympic athletes of Great Britain
20th-century English women
21st-century English women
Commonwealth Games bronze medallists for England
Commonwealth Games medallists in athletics
Athletes (track and field) at the 2022 Commonwealth Games
Medallists at the 2022 Commonwealth Games